The following is a list of episodes of the German television series R. I. S. – Die Sprache der Toten.

As of February 7, 2008, 25 episodes have aired.

Season 1 (2007)
Season 1 features 12 episodes.

Season 2 (2007-2008)
13 Episodes being produced for Season 2.

R. I. S. - Die Sprache der Toten